Simón Rodrigo Ramírez (born April 12, 1985, in Morón, Argentina) is an Argentine footballer who plays for J.J. de Urquiza of the Primera C in Argentina. His height is 1.85m.

Teams
  Argentinos Juniors 2006
  El Porvenir 2006-2007
  All Boys 2007-2009
  Cobreloa 2006-2007
  Deportivo Merlo 2010–2012
  J.J. de Urquiza 2012–

Titles
  All Boys 2007-2008 (Primera B Metropolitana)

References

 
 

1985 births
Living people
Argentine footballers
Argentine expatriate footballers
Argentinos Juniors footballers
All Boys footballers
Cobreloa footballers
Deportivo Merlo footballers
Expatriate footballers in Chile
Association football midfielders
People from Morón Partido
Sportspeople from Buenos Aires Province